Jiang Style Baguazhang (姜氏八卦掌) is the style of Baguazhang (八卦掌) taught by Jiang Rong Qiao (姜容樵) 1890-1974. Jiang Rong Qiao (also anglicized as Chiang Jung Ch’iao) was a student of both Zhang Zhaodong who learned the art of baguazhang from Cheng Tinghua and Li Cunyi, a famous xingyiquan master. Cheng was one of the last students of Dong Haichuan  (董海川). Jiang Rong Qiao's Neijia kung fu is one of the most widely practiced combined styles of Baguazhang, and Xingyiquan in the world today. Jiang's Baguazhang is distinguished by emphasizing efficiency of movement and ambidextrousness.

Influences
Zhang Zhaodong appears to have been the dominant influence on this style, but Jiang Rong Qiao had many other influences. Jiang Rong Qiao started his training as a student of the Shaolin Kung Fu art of Mizongquan with his father, Jiang Fatai. Jiang Rong Qiao later studied more formally with his uncle, Chen Yushan. Jiang also studied Chen-style taijiquan and Wudang Sword. Eventually, Jiang Rong Qiao became a formal student of Zhang Zhaodong, who had studied with both Dong Haichuan and Liu Qilan. Jiang Rong Qiao also studied with Li Cunyi, a close associate of Zhang Zhaodong. Li Cunyi (also known as Single Saber Li) was also a student of Dong Haichuan and Liu Qilan. While it is said that Zhang and Li were students of Dong Haichuan, they were most likely taught by their friend Cheng Tinghua because Dong Haichuan was so much older. While Jiang Rong Qiao did not become a formal disciple of Li, Li Cunyi was clearly a significant influence on Jiang. Also, Jiang Rong Qiao studied Liuhebafa with Wu Yi Hui during his stay in Nanjing. Later when he became friends with Wu's disciple Chen Yi Ren, he further studied Liuhebafa in exchange for teaching his system to Chen. He personally wrote about his Liuhebafa study in Chen Yi Ren's 1969 published book entitled Liuhebafa Chuan.

System
Jiang's system of Bagua was kept simple. His concept was to focus developing the essence of Bagua and not over complicating it with more forms and movements. His version went through a drastic change though sometime during his life, which most say occurred perhaps when he lost his eyesight. His original system that he taught was simply called Lao Bagua, meaning "old or traditional bagua". Later on Jiang changed his concept and revised his whole system to what is generally seen today as Xin Bagua, meaning "new bagua". The material he taught included:

 Bagua Yi Lu 八卦一路 (1st form):
 Lao Ba Zhang 老八掌 (Old 8 Palms - taught to earlier students)
 Xin Ba Zhang 新八掌 (New 8 Palms - a revised version of the former taught to later students)
 Bagua Er Lu 八卦二路　(2nd form): Bagua Tui 八卦腿 (Bagua Leg)
 Lao Bagua Tui 老八卦腿 (Old Bagua Leg - taught to earlier students)
 Xin Bagua Tui 新八卦腿 (New Bagua Leg - a revised version of the former taught to later students)
 Zuan Jian 鑽劍 (Drilling Sword)
 Lian Huan Jian 連環劍 (Continuous Sword)
 Spear
 Other routines

Jiang Style Bagua Literature

Jiang was a prolific writer of martial arts manuals during his time. Though most often the writings were of other styles he did write a manual on his own art entitled "Baguazhang Lianxifa (Bagua Palms Practice Method)".

References 

 Baguazhang Lianxifa - Jiang Rong Qiao 1963 manual
 Joseph Crandall's Smiling Tiger website with many English translations of Jiang Rong Qiao's books 
 Gerald Sharp's on-line biography page for Jiang Rong Qiao  and a sample application 
 Jiang Family Internal Arts Research Institute (Japan) - Master Iiyoku Daigo, successor/godson of Zou Shu Xian

Baguazhang styles
Chinese martial arts
Neijia